Karin Hendrika Maria Kuipers (born 18 July 1972 in Zwolle) is a retired Dutch water polo player.

Famous for her killing shots and her modesty, she was a three time best player of the world.

She competed in the 2000 Summer Olympics.

In 2014, she was inducted in the International Swimming Hall of Fame.

See also
 List of world champions in women's water polo
 List of members of the International Swimming Hall of Fame
 List of World Aquatics Championships medalists in water polo

References

External links
 

1972 births
Living people
Dutch female water polo players
Olympic water polo players of the Netherlands
Sportspeople from Zwolle
Water polo players at the 2000 Summer Olympics
World Aquatics Championships medalists in water polo
20th-century Dutch women
21st-century Dutch women